What Now My Love is the sixth album by Herb Alpert & the Tijuana Brass, released in 1966. It remained at #1 on the Billboard Album chart for nine weeks, the longest of any album released by the group.

Critical reception

In his retrospective review for Allmusic, music critic Richard S. Ginell wrote "With this album, Herb Alpert and the Tijuana Brass settle into their hitmaking groove, the once strikingly eclectic elements of Dixieland, pop, rock, and mariachi becoming more smoothly integrated within Alpert's infectious "Ameriachi" blend."

Track listing

Side 1
"What Now My Love" (Gilbert Bécaud, Carl Sigman) - 2:18
"Freckles" (Ervan Coleman) - 2:12
"Memories of Madrid" (Sol Lake) - 2:23
"It Was a Very Good Year" (Ervin Drake) - 3:37
"So What's New?" (John Pisano) - 2:07
"Plucky" (Herb Alpert, Pisano) - 2:21

Side 2
"Magic Trumpet" (Bert Kaempfert) - 2:18
"Cantina Blue" (Sol Lake) - 2:34
"Brasilia" (Julius Wechter) - 2:30
"If I Were a Rich Man" (Sheldon Harnick, Jerry Bock) - 2:33
"Five Minutes More" (Jule Styne, Sammy Cahn) - 1:53
"The Shadow of Your Smile" (Johnny Mandel, Paul Francis Webster) - 3:28

Chart positions

References

1966 albums
Herb Alpert albums
Albums produced by Jerry Moss
Albums produced by Herb Alpert
Albums recorded at Gold Star Studios
A&M Records albums